The 1962 Australian Championships was a tennis tournament that took place on outdoor Grass courts at the White City Tennis Club, Sydney, Australia from 5 January to 15 January. It was the 50th edition of the Australian Championships (now known as the Australian Open), the 14th held in Sydney, and the first Grand Slam tournament of the year. The singles titles were taken by Rod Laver and Margaret Smith. Laver's win was the first step towards his first Grand Slam.

Champions

Men's singles

 Rod Laver defeated  Roy Emerson  8–6, 0–6, 6–4, 6–4

Women's singles

 Margaret Smith defeated  Jan Lehane  6–0, 6–2

Men's doubles
 Roy Emerson /  Neale Fraser defeated   Bob Hewitt /  Fred Stolle 4–6, 4–6, 6–1, 6–4, 11–9

Women's doubles
 Robyn Ebbern /  Margaret Smith defeated  Darlene Hard /  Mary Carter Reitano 6–4, 6–4

Mixed doubles
 Lesley Turner /  Fred Stolle defeated   Darlene Hard /  Roger Taylor 6–3, 9–7

References

External links
 Australian Open official website

1962 in Australian tennis
1962
January 1962 sports events in Australia